Ectoedemia hannoverella is a moth of the family Nepticulidae. It is found from most of Europe (except Ireland) to southern Siberia and European Russia, but it is most common in central Europe. It was not recorded in Great Britain until 2002 when mines were found in fallen leaves of Italian poplar.

The wingspan is 6–7 mm.externally easy to confuse with Ectoedemia turbidella both species having a white discal spot in the basal part of the forewing and many scattered white scales on a dark ground. The genitalia differ. Adults are on wing from April to May in western Europe.

The larvae feed on Populus x canadensis and Populus nigra. They mine the leaves of their host plant. They only feed at night. The first instar larva bores in the petiole, causing local swelling. Once the larva has reached the leaf disc it begins forming an elongate blotch between the leaf margin and the most lateral vein, or in some cases between the midrib and the first lateral vein. The frass is concentrated in two stripes running parallel to the sides of the mine. Pupation takes place outside of the mine.

External links
Fauna Europaea
Nepticulidae from the Volga and Ural region
A Taxonomic Revision Of The Western Palaearctic Species Of The Subgenera Zimmermannia Hering And Ectoedemia Busck s.str. (Lepidoptera, Nepticulidae), With Notes On Their Phylogeny
bladmineerders.nl
UKmoths

Nepticulidae
Moths of Europe
Moths of Asia
Moths described in 1872